Enjoy The Ride is the debut studio album from Swedish pop music singer Marie Serneholt, led by the first single and number two hit "That's The Way My Heart Goes". The album was released on March 29, 2006, debuting at number nine in Sweden, but falling quickly on the charts. The album's second single, "I Need A House", did nothing for the album's success despite peaking at number 40 on the Swedish Singles Chart and number two on the Swedish Download Chart. The album's third single "Oxygen" was premiered on radio in mid-October and the video was premiered on October 26. The single has been released as a digital download in Sweden but no official release date has been announced for a release on CD.

Serneholt was said to be preparing for the international release of the album in Germany, Switzerland and other European countries, however plans for worldwide distribution never came to fruition, aside from the album being released in Taiwan as a limited edition.

Background
Serneholt knew that she wanted to embark on a solo career after A*Teens' parted ways, but wanted to absorb all the impressions of the past years first. She needed the right people to work with as well as the right material.

Serneholt first contacted Jörgen Elofsson several years ago. At that point, however, Elofsson's schedule was full, and Marie wasn't yet sure in what direction to take her career. And in 2005 she felt she had a vision and called him again. This time, all the pieces fell into place. Elofsson had just started collaborating with two relatively young and unknown producers, Richard Brandén and Pär Westerlund.

Serneholt decided she wanted to make a Pop album, Elofsson was relieved, There are so many artists that suddenly want to start working with R&B with cool beats or riff-based rock.

Elofsson is listed as co-writer of every track on the album. Besides writing with his co-producers, he has also co-written with the legendary Nicky Chinn and Swedish colleague Andreas Carlsson among others.

Elofsson started his own record company Planet Six, a part of SonyBMG. With this, Serneholt and Elofsson could work undisturbed and at their own pace, with no involvement of any record companies, media or outside opinions. Elofsson had saved choice tidbits, songs that would have been guaranteed hits with established artists.

Track listing
"Enjoy the Ride" – 3:10  
"Wasted Love" – 3:15
"That's the Way My Heart Goes" – 3:34
"I Need a House" – 3:00
"Beyond Tonight" – 4:20
"I Love Making Love in the Morning" – 3:31
"The Boy I Used To Know" – 2:50
"Calling All Detectives" – 3:56
"Can't Be Loved" – 3:53
"Oxygen" – 4:23

Charts

References
Notes:

2006 debut albums
Marie Serneholt albums